John Henning  may refer to:

John Henning (1771–1851), snr, sculptor
John Henning (journalist) (1937–2010), American reporter and political analyst
John F. Henning (1915–2009), U.S. Labor leader and ambassador